The 2016 AFC Champions League Final was the final of the 2016 AFC Champions League, the 35th edition of the top-level Asian club football tournament organized by the Asian Football Confederation (AFC), and the 14th under the current AFC Champions League title.

The final was contested in two-legged home-and-away format between South Korean team Jeonbuk Hyundai Motors and United Arab Emirates team Al-Ain. The first leg was hosted by Jeonbuk Hyundai Motors at the Jeonju World Cup Stadium in Jeonju on 19 November 2016, while the second leg was hosted by Al-Ain at the Hazza Bin Zayed Stadium in Al Ain on 26 November 2016. Jeonbuk Hyundai Motors won the final 3–2 at overall and clinched their second title.

Qualified teams

Background

Road to the final

Note: In all results below, the score of the finalist is given first (H: home; A: away).

Rules
The final was played on a home-and-away two-legged basis, with the order of legs decided by draw. The away goals rule, extra time (away goals do not apply in extra time) and penalty shoot-out were used to decide the winner if necessary.

Match details

First leg

Second leg

References

External links
AFC Champions League, the-AFC.com

2016
Final
Jeonbuk Hyundai Motors matches
Al Ain FC matches
International club association football competitions hosted by South Korea
International club association football competitions hosted by the United Arab Emirates